Khalid Ahmad Bazzi (March 15, 1969 - July 29, 2006) was a  commander in Hizbullah's military wing, the Islamic Resistance in Lebanon. In the 2006 Lebanon War he was commanding officer in the defence of Maroun ar-Ras and Bint Jbeil. The heavy Israeli casualties and lack of progress of its army in these two battles is widely seen as the main cause of the Israeli failure in the war.

Early history
Bazzi was born in the town of Bint Jbeil in South Lebanon. He joined Hizbullah as a teenager, and fought against the Israelis during the 1985-2000 South Lebanon conflict in Israeli-occupied southern Lebanon. During the 2006 Lebanon War he was sector commander in the Bint Jbeil area, comprising the towns of Bint Jbeil and Aynata and the villages of Maroun ar-Ras and Aytaroun. He personally participated in both the Battle of Maroun al-Ras and the Battle of Bint Jbeil. He was killed in an Israeli drone strike during the Battle of Bint Jbeil, and was one of the most senior Hizbullah commanders to die in the war.

Khalid Bazzi was thirteen years old in 1982, when his hometown was occupied by Israel for the third time in his lifetime. Bint Jbeil was occupied in Operation Cauldron 4 Extended in 1972 and Operation Litani in 1978. This time the Israelis would stay 18 years. The Shiite population of Southern Lebanon had suffered hard during the years of fighting between the Palestinians and Israelis. Many residents of South Lebanon felt an initial relief after the Palestinian guerrillas where pushed back from the area. This feeling soon turned sour when it became clear that the Israelis were there to stay. An armed resistance developed, this time among the Shiite population of South Lebanon that constituted the majority population in the area.

Bazzi thus grew up under the Israeli occupation. Some of his relatives had previously been active in the Palestinian Fatah movement. Bazzi and his friends soon became sympathetic or even active in the emerging Islamic Resistance.

In 1985 Israel withdrew from most of south Lebanon but continued to control a security zone, comprising about 10 per cent of the area of Lebanon. The IDF launched purges in the Shiite villages remaining under occupation, arresting people suspected of being involved in the resistance. Several of Bazzi’s friends were arrested and taken to the notorious al-Khiyyam prison camp. Bazzi himself fled his home one night and slipped out of the security zone. He went to Beirut and started studying at the university. He soon dropped out of school and became a full-time activist in the resistance.

During his more than 20 years of resistance activity he participated in many operations, such as the famous Bra'shit operation in 1987. Fighters from the Islamic Resistance stormed and conquered an outpost belonging to the South Lebanon Army (SLA) in the security zone. A number of its defenders were killed or taken prisoner and the Hizbullah flag was raised on top of it. A Sherman tank was blown up and a M113 Armored Personal Carrier was captured and driven triumphantly all the way to Beirut.

Bazzi was involved in the planting of deadly road side bombs, such as in Houla, Markaba and al-Abbad in the 1990s. He took part in the attempted killing of Brig. Gen. Eli Amitai, the head of the Israel Defense Forces liaison unit in southern Lebanon and thus the effective commander of the security zone. December 14, 1996, Amitai was injured when the IDF convoy he was travelling in was ambushed in the eastern sector of the security zone. Less than a week later Amitai was again injured when Hizbullah unleashed a mortar barrage on an SLA position near Bra'shit he was visiting together with Maj. Gen. Amiram Levine, head of the IDF's Northern Command.

He also took part in the assassination of several high-ranking South Lebanon Army (SLA) officers, whom Hizbullah considered traitors, including as Aql Hashem, the SLA Second-in Command, who was killed by a remote-controlled bomb in January 2000. The pursuit and assassination of Hashim was documented step by step, and the footage was broadcast on Hizbullah TV channel al-Manar. The operation and the way it was presented in media dealt a devastating blow to the morale in the SLA.

After 2000
Israeli withdrawal from the security zone in the spring of 2000 precipitated a virtual collapse of the Israel-controlled South Lebanon Army. On May 26, 2000 Hizbullah General-Secretary Hassan Nasrallah held his famous victory speech in Bint Jbeil, where he compared the power of Israel to that of a spider's web. Nasrallah's speech infuriated many Israeli officers. This anger explains to a large extent why Bint Jbeil was targeted in 2006.

After the Israeli withdrawal from South Lebanon, Khalid Bazzi returned to Bint Jbeil and continued his involvement with military activities. He was made responsible for "capturing" operations. He took part in the Ghajar raid in 2005, when four Hizbullah fighters were killed in a failed attempt to abduct an Israeli soldier. Bazzi organized 2006 Hezbollah cross-border raid, in which eight Israeli soldiers were killed and two were abducted. This triggered the 2006 Lebanon War.

After abduction of the two soldiers, Bazzi returned to his post as Chief of Operations in the Bint Jbeil area, comprising the towns of Bint Jbeil and Aynata and the villages of Maroun ar-Ras and Aytaroun. He commanded a force of approximately 140 fighters, spread out in the area.

Bazzi participated in the Battle of Maroun al-Ras. The Israeli army eventually conquered most of the village after 10 days of fighting. The Hizbullah defenders eventually withdrew causing heavy casualties to the Israelis, including two IDF officers and six other soldiers killed.  Due to Bazzi's reluctance to use two-way radios, contact was lost with him several times during the battle and at one time it was feared that he had been killed. He emerged however unscathed and continued to lead the defense from Bint Jbeil. According to Hizbullah only seven of the 17 defenders of Maroun ar-Ras were killed in that battle.

On July 23, the Israeli army launched Operation Webs of Steel 2 which was designed as a pincer movement, attacking Bint Jbeil simultaneously from the east and the west. The aim was to conquer the town and purge it of Hizbullah fighters and infrastructure. Israel failed to occupy the town and suffered heavy casualties.

After several days of fighting the Israeli forces unexpectedly withdrew. Bint Jbeil was however largely destroyed by intensive bombardment from the Israeli air force and artillery.

On July 29 Bazzi was killed in an Israeli drone strike on a house in the Old Town of Bint Jbeil. The house collapsed, killing him, as well as fellow Hizbullah commander Sayyid Abu Taam and a third fighter. Their bodies could not be retrieved until several days after the cease-fire.

There are suggestions that Bazzi earlier had refused to obey orders to withdraw from the town saying that he would "only leave as a martyr". Hizbullah commanders who spoke to Lebanese al-Akhbar a year after the war did not confirm this version of events. According to them the proper place for a commander was with the fighters on the battlefield. Bazzi and Abu Taam however were criticized for violating military regulations by being at the same place during a battle.

Bazzi was succeeded as sector commander by Muhammad Qanso (Sajid ad-Duwayyir), a Special Force commander who himself would be killed in an Israeli airstrike 10 days later. The Israeli army made a second attempt to capture Bint Jbeil August 6–8, which was no more successful than the first.

Legacy 
The battles led by Khalid Bazzi were considered the most crucial in the Lebanon War of 2006.
First Maroun ar-Ras and later Bint Jbeil was attacked by four Israeli elite divisions, while it was only defended by a company-sized force (100-140 men) of mainly local militia. Yet, the IDF failed repeatedly to conquer the town, in spite of suffering heavy casualties. 35 IDF soldiers, including seven officers, were killed in these two battles.

The Israeli leaders primarily responsible for the conduct of the war, Prime minister Olmert, Defense minister Peretz and Chief of Staff Halutz, were all in agreement in their testimony to the Winograd Commission. The 2006 Lebanon War would have been a "clear achievement for Israel had the initial limited ground operations in Maroun ar-Ras and Bint Jbeil been successful".

Hizbullah is a very secretive organization and members in the military wing are always kept anonymous. Apart from Bazzi’s friends, relatives and neighbours, few Lebanese would have heard of his name before the war of 2006. To his associates in the resistance movement he was known as al-Hajj Qasim, the nom de guerre or "organizational name" that members of the Islamic Resistance use inside the movement. Only with his death did his identity become widely known in Lebanon.

Hizbullah secretary-general Hassan Nasrallah noted in an interview with New TV shortly after the war (August 27, 2006) that none of the first or second level of the party officials had martyred but that three third level leaders had died in the war. Among them was "an operations officer in the Bint Jbeil axis". Although not mentioned by name, this was an obvious reference to Bazzi. The other two commanders Nasrallah referred to were Muhammad Qanso and Muhammad Wahbi Surour.

On the first anniversary of his death in 2007, Lebanese newspaper al-Akhbar revealed that Bazzi both took part in the cross-border operation and that he died as commander in the battle of Bint Jbeil. 

Surprisingly, Israel seemed long to have been unaware of the significant role Bazzi played both in the abduction of the two Israeli soldiers and in the battle of Bint Jbeil and of his death in this battle. 
When a captured Hizbullah fighter, who participated in the abduction operation, told his captors that he had been commissioned his tasks by "al-Hajj Qasim" (Bazzi's nom de guerre), his interrogators only responded: "which Qasim?". According to Robert Baer, the former CIA case officer in Lebanon, the Americans and the Israelis never knew the identities of Hizbullah's field commanders.

Israeli newspapers did not notice his existence until six years after in was made public in Lebanon. In July 2013 Haaretz reported that Hizbullah "for the first time" revealed the identity of Khalid Bazzi as the commander of the abduction unit and that he was subsequently killed in the war.

Khalid Bazzi was buried in the Martyrs’ cemetery in Bint Jbeil. A monument was erected in the town celebrating him and five other commanders or fighters from Bint Jbeil, who died in the 2006 war or in previous wars. He was survived by his wife and three children, Zaynab, Muhammad and Ali. His family has reportedly had to change homes 14 times in the past 18 years due to security considerations.

External links
 (The Prince of the Battlefields) أمير الميادين, Documentary from al-Manar about Khalid Bazzi (Arabic)

References

1969 births
2006 deaths
People from South Lebanon
People from Bint Jbeil District
Hezbollah members
2006 in Lebanon
2006 Lebanon War